IBM Notes Traveler (formerly IBM Lotus Notes Traveler) is a software, a push-email product which provides access to email and Personal Information Management (PIM) application for IBM Notes customers using supported mobile devices. Version 9.0 supports Android 2.x, 3.x, and 4.x; Apple iPhone and iPad; Microsoft Windows Mobile 5 and 6; Windows Phone 7 and 8; Windows RT; Blackberry 10; and Symbian Series 60 mobile platforms as well as Microsoft Outlook and Windows 8 desktop platforms.

IBM Notes Traveler synchronizes email, calendar, contacts, journal and to-do data through wireless networks with an IBM Domino server. The software provides basic email collaboration features such as create, reply, forward and delete (including attachment support). It also provides meeting-request support, including accepting and rejecting meeting invitations with comments, as well as attachment handling. Eligible IBM Notes customers can download the software free of charge.

IBM Notes Traveler software uses a Secure Sockets Layer (SSL) connection for encrypting data that travels over the air via an HTTPS protocol.

Compare IBM Verse.

See also
IBM Notes
IBM Domino
IBM iNotes

References

External links
IBM Notes and Domino home page
IBM Notes Traveler home page
What's New in IBM Notes Traveler 9.0 Documentation
IBM Notes Traveler Product Documentation
Press Article: IBM Delivers Enterprise Secure Mail for Android, iPhone, Nokia Symbian Smartphones
IBM Business Partner Link: Monitor the health of Lotus Traveler using VitalSigns from RPR Wyatt

Notes Traveler
IBM Notes Traveler
IBM Notes Traveler